The Deer and the Cauldron  is a Chinese television series adapted from Louis Cha's novel The Deer and the Cauldron. It was directed by Lai Shui-ching, and starred Han Dong, Wei Qianxiang and others. The series was shot from September–December 2013, and first aired on Anhui TV, Sichuan TV and Yunnan TV from 20 December 2014 to 9 January 2015.

Cast

 Han Dong as Wei Xiaobao
 Wei Qianxiang as Kangxi Emperor
Zhang Meng as Shuang'er
 Lou Yixiao as Princess Jianning
 Viann Zhang as Su Quan
 Jia Qing as A'ke / Chen Yuanyuan
 Wu Qian as Mu Jianping
 Zhao Yuanyuan as Fang Yi
 Wang Yahui as Zeng Rou
 Wang Lin as Wei Chunhua
 Michelle Yim as Empress Dowager
 Lai Shui-ching as Oboi
 Ji Chunhua as Hai Dafu
 Li Qingxiang as Songgotu
 Liu Yong as Duolong
 Wen Jie as Prince Kang
 He Zhonghua as Chen Jinnan
 Wang Wanjuan as Jiunan
 Feng Jingao as Wu Sangui
 Gu Bin as Wu Yingxiong
 Lin Jiangguo as Zheng Keshuang
 Meng Fei as Feng Xifan
 Liu Dekai as Shunzhi Emperor
 Ashton Chen as Jingyuan
 Jin Song as Mao Shiba
 Lu Yong as Hong Antong
 Tan Limin as Tao Hongying
 Min Zheng as Feng Jizhong
 Yu Kar-lun as Taoist Xuanzhen
 Wu Lipeng as Mu Jiansheng
 Wu Huaxin as Liu Yizhou
 Ren Xihong as Wu Lishen
 Xu Ming as Liu Dahong
 Tang Jin as Wen Youyi
 Hou Ruixiang as Wen Youdao
 Liu Changde as Feng Yifei
 Liu Changsheng as Xu Tianchuan
 Lin Yizheng as Thin Monk
 Gu Dechao as Fat Monk
 Wang Yi as Mao Dongzhu
 Zhong Lei as Bai Hanfeng
 Li Quanyou as Guan Anji
 Liu Wei as Qian Laoben
 Zhu Jiazhen as Qi Laosan
 Zhong Jiufu as Yang Yizhi
 Xie Qijun as Zhao Qixian
 Han Yinlong as Taoist Wugen

External links
     The Deer & The Cauldron  official weibo on Sina.com
   The Deer & The Cauldron  official website

Chinese wuxia television series
Works based on The Deer and the Cauldron
Television series set in the Qing dynasty
2014 Chinese television series debuts
2015 Chinese television series endings
Television shows based on works by Jin Yong
Television series by Huace Media